Colerain is a town in Bertie County, North Carolina, United States. The population was 204 at the 2010 census.

Etymology and history
Colerain, North Carolina, was named after Coleraine in Ireland.

On April 16, 2011, the western side of the town was hit by an EF3 tornado that killed 12 people and caused extensive damage.

The Garrett-White House was added to the National Register of Historic Places in 1982.

Geography
Colerain is located at  (36.201138, -76.768050).

Demographics

As of the census of 2000, there were 221 people, 103 households, and 66 families residing in the town. The population density was 821.1 people per square mile (316.0/km2). There were 121 housing units at an average density of 449.5 per square mile (173.0/km2). The racial makeup of the town was 93.21% White, 2.71% African American and 4.07% Native American. Hispanic or Latino of any race were 4.07% of the population.

There were 103 households, out of which 19.4% had children under the age of 18 living with them, 61.2% were married couples living together, 1.0% had a female householder with no husband present, and 35.9% were non-families. 32.0% of all households were made up of individuals, and 18.4% had someone living alone who was 65 years of age or older. The average household size was 2.15 and the average family size was 2.70.

In the town, the population was spread out, with 16.7% under the age of 18, 5.0% from 18 to 24, 24.4% from 25 to 44, 29.4% from 45 to 64, and 24.4% who were 65 years of age or older. The median age was 47 years. For every 100 females, there were 85.7 males. For every 100 females age 18 and over, there were 91.7 males.

The median income for a household in the town was $33,281, and the median income for a family was $38,750. Males had a median income of $39,028 versus $21,786 for females. The per capita income for the town was $24,573. About 1.4% of families and 4.5% of the population were below the poverty line, including none of those under the age of eighteen and 12.0% of those 65 or over.

References

Towns in Bertie County, North Carolina
Towns in North Carolina